Raymond Félix Stora (18 September 1930 – 20 July 2015) was a French theoretical physicist.  He was a research director at the French National Centre for Scientific Research (CNRS), as well as a member of CERN's theory group.  His work focused on particle physics.

Stora studied at the École Polytechnique from 1951 to 1953, and then at Massachusetts Institute of Technology (MIT), where he received a doctorate in 1958 under the supervision of Victor Weisskopf.  Stora's most influential contribution to physics was his work with Carlo Becchi and Alain Rouet on a rigorous mathematical procedure for quantizing non-Abelian gauge field theories, which dates from the mid 1970s and is now known as BRST quantization.

Stora was elected as a correspondent to the physics section of the French Academy of Sciences in 1994.  In 2009, he was awarded the Dannie Heineman Prize for Mathematical Physics. CNRS held a special conference in his honour some months after his 80th birthday.

References

1930 births
2015 deaths
Theoretical physicists
Members of the French Academy of Sciences
20th-century French physicists
Jewish scientists
Winners of the Max Planck Medal
MIT Department of Physics alumni
École Polytechnique alumni
Scientists from Paris
Mathematical physicists
People associated with CERN